Sokoli is a surname. Notable people with the surname include:

Fatime Sokoli (1948–1987), Albanian folk music singer
Hodo Sokoli (1836–1883), Albanian colonel
Kristjan Sokoli (born 1991), Albanian American football player
Mic Sokoli (1839–1881), Albanian nationalist figure and guerrilla fighter
Paolo Sokoli (born 1995), Albanian footballer
Ramadan Sokoli (1920–2008), Albanian ethnomusicologist, musician, composer and writer 

Albanian-language surnames